This is page shows results of Canadian federal elections in the Winnipeg area.

Regional profile
The city of Winnipeg has traditionally been a mixed bag, in which all three major parties have bases of support. The northern part of the city is a very left-leaning area which has some of the strongest New Democratic Party support in all of Canada. The south end (with many Jewish and Franco-Manitoban voters) is one of the few areas in the Prairies where the Liberals have been successful since the 1990s. The outer suburban areas tilt rightward, but this was obscured for most of the 1990s by massive vote-splitting.

The end of vote-splitting on the right allowed the Conservatives to win two seats in 2004, in one case defeating a star candidate. The Conservatives picked up another seat in 2006, one more in 2008 and two additional seats in 2011—including Elmwood—Transcona, the former seat of longtime NDP MP and former deputy leader Bill Blaikie. In 2015, however, the Liberals took all but one seat in Winnipeg en route to their second-largest seat count ever. The only seat that didn't get swept up in the Liberal tide was Elmwood—Transcona, where Blaikie's son Daniel Blaikie narrowly retook the seat for the NDP. It was the first time since 1968, and only the second time since the end of World War II, that the centre-right was completely shut out of Winnipeg in the absence of vote-splitting. The Tories picked up the outer suburban seats of Charleswood—St. James—Assiniboia—Headingley and Kildonan—St. Paul in 2019.

2015 - 42nd General Election

2011 - 41st General Election

2008 - 40th General Election

2006 - 39th General Election

2004 - 38th General Election

|-
| style="background-color:whitesmoke" |Charleswood—St. James
|
|Glen Murray17,95442.55%
||
|Steven John Fletcher18,68844.29%
|
|Peter Carney4,28310.15%
|
|Andrew Basham8802.09%
|
|Beatriz Alas490.12%
|
|Dan Zupansky3370.80%
|
|
|
|vacant1
|-
| style="background-color:whitesmoke" |Elmwood—Transcona
|
|Tanya Parks4,92316.81%
|
|Bryan McLeod7,64426.11%
||
|Bill Blaikie15,22151.99%
|
|Elijah Gair7192.46%
|
|Paul Sidon740.25%
|
|Gavin Whittaker3111.06%
|
|Robert Scott (CHP)3861.32%
||
|Bill Blaikie
|-
| style="background-color:whitesmoke" |Kildonan—St. Paul
|
|Terry Duguid13,30436.54%
||
|Joy Smith13,58237.30%
|
|Lorene Mahoney8,20222.53%
|
|Jacob Giesbrecht7562.08%
|
|
|
|Rebecca Whittaker2900.80%
|
|Katharine Reimer (CHP)2780.76%
| colspan=2 style="text-align:center;" |new district
|-
| style="background-color:whitesmoke" |Saint Boniface
||
|Raymond Simard17,98946.61%
|
|Ken Cooper11,95630.98%
|
|Mathieu Allard6,95418.02%
|
|Daniel Backé9252.40%
|
|Gérard Guay770.20%
|
|Chris Buors3170.82%
|
|Jeannine Moquin-Perry (CHP)3780.98%
||
|Raymond Simard
|-
| style="background-color:whitesmoke" |Winnipeg Centre
|
|David Northcott9,28534.69%
|
|Robert Eng3,63113.56%
||
|Pat Martin12,14945.39%
|
|Robin (Pilar) Faye1,1514.30%
|
|Anna-Celestrya Carr1140.43%
|
|John M. Siedleski3461.29%
|
|Douglas Edward Schweitzer (Ind.)920.34%
||
|Pat Martin
|-
|rowspan=3  style="background-color:whitesmoke" |Winnipeg North
|rowspan=3|
|rowspan=3|Rey D. Pagtakhan9,49136.55%
|rowspan=3|
|rowspan=3|Kris Stevenson3,18612.27%
|rowspan=3 |
|rowspan=3|Judy Wasylycia-Leis1/>2.04%
|rowspan=3|
|rowspan=3|Darrell Rankin1110.43%
|rowspan=3|
|rowspan=3|
|rowspan=3|
|rowspan=3|Eric Truijen (CHP)1410.54%
||
|Rey Pagtakhan
|-
| colspan=2 style="text-align:center;" |merged district
|-
||
|Judy Wasylycia-Leis
|-
| style="background-color:whitesmoke" |Winnipeg South
||
|Reg Alcock19,27051.31%
|
|Rod Bruinooge12,77034.00%
|
|Catherine Green4,21711.23%
|
|Ron Cameron1,0032.67%
|
|
|
|
|
|Jane MacDiarmid (CHP)2960.79%
||
|Reg Alcock
|-
| style="background-color:whitesmoke" |Winnipeg South Centre
||
|Anita Neville18,13346.60%
|
|Raj Joshi10,51627.02%
|
|James Allum8,27021.25%
|
|Ian Scott1,5083.88%
|
|Andrew Dalgliesh810.21%
|
|Andy Caisse2930.75%
|
|Magnus Thompson (CAP)1140.29%
||
|Anita Neville
|}

Canadian federal election results in Manitoba